IDAPI stands for Integrated Database Application Program Interface or Independent Database Application Program Interface.  It was originally a component of the Paradox relational database management system.  It is now the application program interface of the BDE or Borland Database Engine.

Proprietary database management systems